

{{DISPLAYTITLE:Psi1 Aurigae}}

Psi1 Aurigae (ψ1 Aur, ψ1 Aurigae) is a star in the northern constellation of Auriga. It is faintly visible to the naked eye with an apparent visual magnitude of 4.91. It is receding from the Sun with a radial velocity of +4.7 km/s.

This is a massive supergiant star with a stellar classification of K5-M1Iab-Ib. It is a slow irregular variable of the LC type, with its brightness varying in magnitude by 0.44. The star is more than 14 times as massive as the Sun and is blazing with 63,579 times the Sun's luminosity. This energy is being radiated into outer space from its outer atmosphere at an effective temperature of 3,750 K, giving it the orange-red hue of a cool M-type star.

See also
 Psi Aurigae

References

External links
 HR 2289
 Image Psi1 Aurigae

M-type supergiants
Slow irregular variables
Auriga (constellation)
Aurigae, Psi01
Durchmusterung objects
044537
030520
Aurigae, 46
2289